The Mel Bernie Company, trading as 1928 Jewelry Company (and sometimes referred to simply as "1928 Jewelry") is a manufacturer and wholesaler of costume jewelry and novelties. They also distribute their products directly to consumers through their website.

Company information
The 1928 Jewelry Company was founded by Melvyn Bernie in 1968. Today, it is one of the largest and last standing jewelry manufacturers in the U.S. The company specializes in reproductions and interpretations of antique jewelry designs. It is located in Burbank, California and has about 250 employees as of 2013. It is a privately held company.

Environmental issues
In 1993, The Mel Bernie Company reportedly discharged 250 pounds of toxic copper compounds into groundwater and was included in a United States Environmental Protection Agency (EPA) report, based on 1995 data, as a "large quantity generator of hazardous waste".

In 2000, the company entered into a consent decree with the California Department of Toxic Substances Control (DTSC). The Department had accused the Mel Bernie Company of illegally polluting runoff water with cyanide and other toxic byproducts of jewelry manufacture.  The Mel Bernie Company, without admitting any violation, agreed to ensure that its operations would comply with state regulations in future, initiate inspection procedures, and train employees in toxic waste handling.

In 2002, the California DTSC obtained an enforcement order after a 2001 inspection found eight violations of state environmental law at the Mel Bernie Company, including keeping a leaking hazardous waste tank in operation and keeping toxic substances in improperly labeled containers.

In 2005, the company reached a settlement with the California DTSC to resolve a dispute regarding the 2002 enforcement decree. Again without admitting any violation, the Mel Bernie Company again agreed to train employees in toxic waste handling and to pay an additional fine of $25,000US. Company has corrected all violations noted during the inspection.

References

Further reading
Info World

External links
Official website

Manufacturing companies established in 1968
Online retailers of the United States
Companies based in Los Angeles County, California
Privately held companies based in California
1968 establishments in California